The Broad View Ranch Historic District is a nationally recognized agricultural historic district located northwest of Sheldon, Iowa, United States. It was listed on the National Register of Historic Places in 1994.  At the time of its nomination it contained 19 resources, which included nine contributing buildings, one contributing site, four contributing structures, and two non-contributing structures.

Charles F. Peters was a native of Prussia who immigrated to the United States in 1868 at 18 years old. He bought his first quarter section of land in Lyon County in 1882, and began a cattle operation. Initially, his cattle grazed freely on unoccupied land, but as the county became more populated he acquired two more sections. He constructed buildings for his operation, including the 1889 main barn, the cattle barn, silo barn, and granary all constructed in 1890. He built his Italianatehouse in 1896, which has been significantly altered in subsequent years. Other domestic structures include buildings to store coal, ice, and house laying hens. A grove of hardwoods that was planted on the north and west edges of the farmstead forming a wind break is a contributing site. The ranch remains in the Peters family.

References

Farms on the National Register of Historic Places in Iowa
Historic districts on the National Register of Historic Places in Iowa
Historic districts in Lyon County, Iowa
National Register of Historic Places in Lyon County, Iowa